The boys' halfpipe event in snowboarding at the 2020 Winter Youth Olympics took place on 21 January at the Leysin Park & Pipe.

Qualification
The qualification was started at 09:30.

Final
The final was started at 12:55.

References

Boys' halfpipe